Kyonpyaw is a town in the Ayeyawady Division of Myanmar. It is the seat of Kyonpyaw Township. As of 2014 the population was 23,966.

Wards
Kyonpyaw consists 4 wards and they are:
Taza Ward
Myawady Ward
Panglong Ward
Aung San Ward

In popular culture
Kenneth Sein's book The Great Po Sein chronicling the famous Burmese dance actor Po Sein, the character of a young Po Sein lives in Kyonpyaw when a dance troupe passes through the town, prompting his interest.

References

External links
 Satellite map at Maplandia.com

Populated places in Ayeyarwady Region
Township capitals of Myanmar